Komakkambedu (KKB) is a village located 9 miles north of Thiruninravur. Most of the village is occupied by Vanniyar and Naidu caste. This village is right now facing brain drain. Most of the youngsters have either relocated to the cities or outside India. Many of them are in the USA. Farming is the occupation of most of the villagers. More than twenty Self Help Groups (SHG) are formed for the welfare and development of women.

There are four beautiful temples in the village, namely Mariamman temple, Permal temple, Pillayar temple and Chelliamman temple. There will be a grand carnival function at Mariamman temple for every five year once. A part of village is named as Indira Nagar which consist of two streets and temples namely Pillayar temple and Om Sakthi temple.

Mariamman temple Kumbhabhishekham

Mariamman temple in komakkambedu is believed to unite the mystic powers of the deity and recently Ashtabandhana kumbhabhishekham was performed. Ashtabandhanam is the process of affixing an idol to its pedestal with a clay-like paste. Kumbha means the head and denotes the crown of the Temple (usually in the Gopuram) and Abhisekham is ritual bathing.

Kumbhabhishekham process was initiate with maha ganapathi homam on 31 August 2017. subsequently Lakshmi homam, ko Poojai and dhan poojai was performed. Amman idol is fixed with a paste consist of herbs mixed with wood lac, limestone powder, resin, red ochre, beeswax and butter. The paste is formed into long rolls about 2 cm thick and applied directly around the base of the idol. On 10 September 2017 at an auspicious time (between 9am to 10:30am), the Kumbha is bathed with the charged and sanctified holy waters in the sacrificial pot and, by a mystic process with Panchavadyam.

A beautiful arch was installed at the entrance of village. Attractive idols of goddess lakshmi, saraswathy, and amman was perfectly placed at the top of the arch. After kumbhabhishekham, maha abhishekham and deeparadhana was duly performed. More than 2500 people participated and worshiped the goddess mariamman.  Abhishekha with water, milk, buttermilk, sandal paste, oils etc. is performed subsequently for 48 days. After 48 days form kumbhabhishekham, mandala poojai is done with 108 sangu-abhishekham. Carnival was ended with amman tiruveedhiula.

Thimithi Thiruvila
There will be a carnival function at Mariamman temple KKB for every five year once in the name of Sri Draupadi Amman Thimithi Thiruvila. Thimithi (Tamil: தீமிதி) or firewalking ceremony is a Hindu festival celebrated  in Tamil Nadu, South India and some other countries. The fire-walking ceremony is in honour of Draupati Amman, who is considered the incarnation of Mariamman. During the period of the festival, scenes from Mahabharata are enacted by the devotees and drama troupes.

References

Villages in Tiruvallur district